Gabby Nsiah Nketiah (born 1 October 1943) is Ghanaian businessman and politician. He was the vice-presidential candidate for the Convention People's Party in the 2016 general elections in Ghana. He is married to Monica Nsiah Nketiah, and their children are David Adomako, Indira Nsiah Nketiah, Cleopatra Nsiah Nketiah, Gabriel Nsiah Nketiah and Kirpal Nsiah Nketiah.

References 

Convention People's Party (Ghana) politicians
Living people
1943 births